Kjeld Toft-Christensen (10 March 1910 – 27 November 1945) MC was a Special Operations Executive officer and Danish resistance fighter during the Second World War. Toft-Christensen was born in Copenhagen to Aage and Elna Elise (née Bonnelycke) Toft-Christensen but later emigrated and joined the French Foreign Legion. During the Second World War he served with the Free French in North Africa before he left for England where he joined the British Army. He was trained as a parachutist and in sabotage tactics in the Buffs (Royal East Kent Regiment) and obtained the rank of Lieutenant. On 4 April 1944 he was dropped into Skive in Denmark to assist the local resistance under the codename "Dahl". Kjeld Toft-Christensen joined the resistance in Aarhus as a liaison and intelligence officer. He became a part of the newly formed L-groups, focused on assassinations, and worked primarily in and around Aarhus.

On 29 April 1945 the Danish interpreter and informant Olaf Christian Quist (Dr. Peters) walked from his room at the Gestapo headquarters in the Old City Hall to the restaurant in Hotel Royal with three Gestapo officers. Christian Quist worked as interpreter during interrogations of resistance fighters and had long been wanted dead by the resistance. Kjeld Toft-Christensen happened to be in the hotel when Christian Quist was seated. Toft-Christensen approached the table and shot Christian Quist twice in the head and then opened fire on the 3 German officers who were incapacitated, wounded or killed. Toft-Christensen subsequently left the hotel and went to a scheduled meeting with his resistance group. The episode earned Kjeld Toft-Christensen some fame and admiration among fellow resistance fighters and it stands as one of the more daring operations in Aarhus during the war.

Kjeld Toft-Christensen survived the war but committed suicide on 27 November 1945. He was posthumously awarded the British Military Cross in 1946.

References

Publications
 
 

1910 births
1945 deaths
Special Operations Executive personnel
Recipients of the Military Cross
People from Copenhagen
1945 suicides
Suicides in Denmark
Free French military personnel of World War II
British Army personnel of World War II
Buffs (Royal East Kent Regiment) officers